Võlla may refer to several places in Estonia:

Võlla, Pärnu County, village in Are Parish, Pärnu County
Võlla, Saare County, village in Muhu Parish, Saare County

See also
Volla (disambiguation)